Joel Gougeon (born January 13, 1943) was a Republican member of the Michigan Senate from 1993-2002 representing the 34th district (then Ogemaw, Arenac, Bay, Tuscola, and Huron counties). He previously served as a member of the Bay County Board of Commissioners.

Gougeon received a mechanical engineering degree in 1966 from what was then the General Motors Institute by co-oping at the Saginaw Malleable Iron Foundry. After five years in the Air Force, Gougeon and his brothers formed Gougeon Brothers, Inc., which manufactured sailboats, epoxy adhesives, and wind energy blades. The methods first developed by the Gougeon brothers using West System epoxy have become the standard techniques taught in colleges the world over for building boats using epoxy. He was also a member of a number of civic organizations, including as a past president of the Bay City Lions Club and as a founder of the Bay County Crime Stoppers.

First elected in a special election in 1993 to succeed Jim Barcia after he was elected to the U.S. House, Gougeon later won two full terms in the Michigan Senate. He served on the appropriations committee. After his retirement from the Legislature, Gougeon served as a lobbyist for Saginaw Valley State University. Gougeon is also a member of the American Legion, the Elks, and the Vietnam Veterans of America.

References

1943 births
Living people
Politicians from Bay City, Michigan
Kettering University alumni
Businesspeople from Michigan
County commissioners in Michigan
Republican Party Michigan state senators
20th-century American politicians
21st-century American politicians